This is a list of people from Lishui prefecture in Zhejiang province. The people listed include those both from Lishui city and the counties and county-level city under its present administration.

C
 Chen Cheng - ROC politician and military leader
 Chen Tiexiong  - administrator, former mayor of Taizhou

D
 Du Guangting - Tang dynasty Daoist
 Duanmu Guohu - Qing dynasty man of letters and poet

H
 He Zhizhong - Song official

J
 Jiang Teli - Southern Song poet

K
 Ke Jie -  professional Go player of 9 dan rank.

L
 Li Lingwei - badminton player
 Li Yang - educator and littérateur, also involved in politics and administration
 Li Zubai - lieutenant general in the National Revolutionary Army turned CCP secret service agent
 Liu Bowen - Yuan and Ming dynasty military strategist, statesman, poet, and prophet

S
 Sung Hsi - historian

T
 Tang Situi - Southern Song politician, official, and prime minister

W
 Wang Shifu - Home-run record holder
 Wang Hao - Tae-kwon-do athlete
 Wei Lan - Qing revolutionary and politician
 Wu Gongda - imperial administrator

X
 Xiong Dun (熊頓) - cartoonist and cancer memoirist

Y
 Yeh Fa-shan - Tang dynasty Daoist, ascended to immortal status
 Ye Shaoweng - Southern Song poet

Z
 Zhang Naiqi - one of the founders of the China National Democratic Association and Xin Pinglun magazine, banker, and administrator
 Zhang Ping - poet
 Zhao Jingshen - author and translator

References
 

Lishui
Lishui